Kristina Brenk née Vrhovec, also known as Kristina Brenkova (22 October 1911 – 20 November 2009) was a Slovene writer, poet, translator and editor, best known for her books for children.

Brenk was born in Horjul in what was then Austria-Hungary in 1911. She studied psychology and pedagogy at the University of Ljubljana and obtained her doctorate in 1939. During the Second World War she joined the Slovene Liberation Front. From 1949 until her retirement in 1973 she worked as an editor at the Mladinska Knjiga publishing house. In 1999 she received the Levstik Award for her lifetime achievement in children's writing. She died in Ljubljana and is buried at Žale.

An award for Best Original Slovene Picture Book bestowed since 2003 by the Slovenian Publishers Association was named after Kristina Brenk from 2011 onwards.

Published works

 Košček sira (A Piece of Cheese), 1971
 Deklica Delfina in lisica Zvitorepka (The Girl Delphina and the Cunning Fox), 1972
 Prva domovina (First Motherland), 1973
 Kruh upanja (Bread of Hope), 1973
 Srebrna račka, zlata račka (Silver Duckling, Golden Duckling), 1975
 Čenča Marenča (Čenča Marenča), 1976
 Kako šteje Čenča Marenča (Čenča Marenča Counting), 1976
 Dobri sovaržnikov pes (The Enemy's Good Dog), 1980
 Hoja za bralci (Walking After Readers), 1980
 Babica v cirkusu (Grandma at the Circus), 1982
 Prigode koze Kunigunde (Tales of Cunigunda the Goat), 1984
 Moja dolina (My Valley), 1996
 Prišel je velikanski lev (The Giant Lion had Arrived), 2008

References

Slovenian children's writers
Slovenian poets
Slovenian women poets
Slovenian editors
Slovenian women editors
1911 births
2009 deaths
Levstik Award laureates
University of Ljubljana alumni
Slovenian women children's writers
20th-century poets
20th-century Slovenian women writers
20th-century Slovenian writers
People from the Municipality of Horjul
Yugoslav writers